Fulen may refer to mountains:

Fulen (2490 m), a peak of the Schwyz Alps, east of Urnersee and right next to the Rossstock, Switzerland
Fulen (2415 m), a peak of the Glarus Alps, east of Sernftal and right south of the Wyssgandstöckli on the border between canton of Glarus and St. Gallen, Switzerland
Fulen (2410 m), second highest peak of the Mürtschenstock, part of the Glarus Alps, Switzerland
Fulen (2057 m), a peak of the Uri Alps, west of Urnersee and north of the Uri Rotstock, Switzerland
Bös Fulen (2802 m), a mountain of the Schwyz Alps, highest mountain of canton of Schwyz, on the border between cantons of Schwyz and Glarus, Switzerland
Chli Fulen (2335 m) and Hoch Fulen (2506 m), mountains of the Glarus Alps, in canton of Uri, Switzerland